Patient Man is the debut studio album by American country music artist Brad Cotter, who in 2004 was declared the winner of the television talent show Nashville Star.. It features the single "I Meant To", a Top 40 hit on the Billboard Hot Country Singles & Tracks (now Hot Country Songs) charts in 2004. "Can't Tell Me Nothin'" and "I Miss Me" were both released as well, peaking at #59 on the same chart.

The track "I Came Here to Live" was later recorded by Trace Adkins on his 2006 album Dangerous Man.

Track listing

Personnel
Mike Brignardello - bass guitar
Tom Bukovac - electric guitar
J. T. Corenflos - electric guitar
Eric Darken - percussion
Larry Franklin - fiddle, mandolin
Paul Franklin - steel guitar
Tony Harrell - piano, B-3 organ, synthesizer
Carl Marsh - keyboard
Greg Morrow - drums, tambourine, shakers, maracas
Steve Nathan - piano, B-3 organ, synthesizer
Russ Pahl - steel guitar
Brent Rowan - electric guitar
Bryan Sutton - acoustic guitar
Russell Terrell - background vocals
Biff Watson - acoustic guitar

Charts

Weekly charts

Year-end charts

References

2004 debut albums
Brad Cotter albums
Epic Records albums